The rivière du Moulin (in English: Mill River) is a tributary of the south shore of the St. Lawrence River. This river flows in the area of Gentilly of the town of Bécancour, in the Bécancour Regional County Municipality, in the administrative region of Centre-du-Québec, in Quebec, in Canada.

Geography 

The main neighboring watersheds of the Moulin river are:
 North side: St. Lawrence River;
 East side: rivière aux Glaises, rivière aux Orignaux;
 South side: Gentilly River, Beaudet River;
 West side: rivière de la Ferme, Gentilly River.

The Moulin river takes its source in an agricultural area to the south-east of the village of Gentilly and to the north of the Gentilly river.

  westward, to route 263;
  north-west, to Chemin des Bouvreuils;
  north, to the rang Saint-Charles road which passes south of the village of Gentilly;
  northeasterly, crossing a first road, then route 132, up to its confluence.

The Rivière du Moulin flows onto the south shore of the St. Lawrence River, in the eastern part of the territory of the town of Bécancour, that is to say to the northeast of the village of Gentilly.

Toponymy 
The toponym Rivière du Moulin was made official on December 5, 1968, at the Commission de toponymie du Québec.

See also 

 List of rivers of Quebec

References 

Rivers of Centre-du-Québec